The 2021 Hawaii Rainbow Warriors football team represented the University of Hawaiʻi at Mānoa in the 2021 NCAA Division I FBS football season. The Rainbow Warriors played their home games on the campus at the Clarence T. C. Ching Athletics Complex as members of the West Division of the Mountain West Conference. They were led by second-year head coach Todd Graham.

Despite losing three straight games en route to finishing the regular season 6–7 overall, the team was invited to play in the Hawaii Bowl as a conditionally-eligible team after the NCAA added an extra bowl game to the schedule. The team accepted the bid on December 3, 2021, marking the team's fourth consecutive postseason appearance, a new program record. However, due to a COVID-19 outbreak, season-ending injuries, and transfers, the team was forced to withdraw the day before the game, marking the Hawaii Bowl’s second consecutive cancellation.

On January 14, 2022, Graham announced his resignation as head coach after reports surfaced of player unrest with his coaching style, along with a report that an apparent players-only vote to not play in the Hawaii Bowl had taken place without his knowledge. He finished 11-11 with two bowl appearances in two seasons, winning the New Mexico Bowl in 2020.

Previous season

The Rainbow Warriors finished the 2020 season 5–4 overall and 4–4 in Mountain West conference play. They accepted an invite to play in the New Mexico Bowl against the University of Houston, where they defeated Houston by a score of 28–14.

It also marked the 46th and final season at Aloha Stadium, as the stadium closed its doors for spectator-driven events on December 17, 2020, after its safety was once again brought into question. The university announced the team would play games on campus for the first time ever on April 12, 2021, launching a campaign to upgrade the Ching Athletics Complex for around $8.3 million, increasing its capacity to 9,000 for the upcoming season. If zoning permits are approved, the plan is to increase capacity to 15,000 starting in 2022.

It will be the first time Hawaii will play football in Honolulu proper since 1974, when the team played at the Honolulu Stadium from 1926 to 1974.

Offseason

2021 recruiting class
The Rainbow Warriors have signed eight recruits out of high school as of February 3, 2021.

Transfers

Outgoing

Incoming

Staff departures

In addition to the staff departures, the program moved their chief of staff Trent Figg to an on-field coaching role to help save the university's athletic department $100,000 in wake of the COVID-19 pandemic.

Preseason

Award watch lists

Mountain West media days
The Mountain West media days were held from July 21–22 at the Cosmopolitan of Las Vegas in Paradise, Nevada.

Media poll
The preseason media poll was released at the Mountain West media days on July 21, 2021. The Rainbow Warriors were predicted to finish in fifth place in the West Division.

Preseason All-Mountain West Team
The Rainbow Warriors had two players selected to the preseason All-Mountain West team.

Defense

Cortez Davis II – CB

Specialists

Calvin Turner – PR

Schedule
The schedule was announced on March 5, 2021.

  Hawaii was forced to withdraw due to COVID-19 and other related issues within the team. The game was canceled shortly after.

Roster

Depth chart

Game summaries

at UCLA

To open the season the Rainbow Warriors traveled to the Rose Bowl in Pasadena to face Dorian Thompson-Robinson and the UCLA Bruins out of the Pac-12 Conference. Hawai'i got the ball to begin the game and went three-and-out. A botched punt gave the Bruins' offense the football at the 'Bows 15. However, the Hawai'i defense held the Bruins to a 27-yard field goal by Nicholas Barr-Mira, giving UCLA a 3-0 lead. Corderio and the 'Bows offense went three-and-out again on their second series. Thompson-Robinson would then proceed to lead the Bruins 87 yards in 9 plays, capped by a 21-yard run by Zach Charbonnet. UCLA now led 10-0. The Bows' offense continued to struggle as Chevan Cordeiro was intercepted by Datona Jackson. The Bruins took over at the Hawai'i 9. Four plays later, Brittain Brown scored on a 1-yard run, putting UCLA ahead 17-0. The Hawai'i offense responded by finally driving into UCLA territory, but it was forced to settle for a 48-yard Matthew Shipley field goal to cut the deficit to 17-3. The Bows' defensive woes continued as Charbonnet scored again, this time from 47 yards out, putting UCLA ahead 24-3. The Bruins led 24-3 at the end of the first quarter. To begin the second quarter, the Bows' drove into UCLA territory. However, the ball went over on downs after Cordeiro failed to connect with Caleb Phillips on 4th-and-9. UCLA responded by taking a 31-3 lead after Charbonnet's third touchdown of the game, a 21-yard run. After trading punts, the Bows' offense achieved a 1st-and-goal at the Bruins' 9. However, the ball went over on downs after Cordeiro failed to connect with Nick Mardner. The Bruins took a 31-3 lead into the locker room.

The Bruins opened the second half by driving 75 yards in 5 plays, culminated by a 44-yard touchdown from Thompson-Robinson to Kazmeir Allen. Barr-Mira's extra point was no good, so the Bruin's lead was now 37-3. The special teams woes for Hawai'i continued as Matthew Shipley's punt was blocked by Ale Kaho and recovered by David Priebe for a Bruins touchdown. UCLA's lead was now 44-3. After trading punts, Cordeiro executed a 9-play, 90-yard drive, finding Caleb Phillips for the 'Bows first touchdown of the season. The UCLA lead was now 44-10. After a three-and-out for the 'Bows, Cordeiro on his next series was intercepted by Jay Shaw. True freshman Brayden Schager out of Highland Park, Texas saw his first collegiate action on the Bows' final series, driving to the UCLA 31 before failing to connect with James Phillips on 4th-and-3. Redshirt freshman quarterback Ethan Garbers finished out the game for the Bruins. The Bruins won the contest 44-10. Cordeiro completed 25 of 47 passes for 220 yards, a touchdown, and 2 interceptions. Schager was 3 of 6 for 23 yards. Thompson-Robinson completed 10 of 20 passes for 130 yards and a touchdown. Charbonnet ran for 106 yards and 3 touchdowns on only 6 carries. The Bruins' rushing attack outgained that of Hawai'i 244 to 26.

Portland State

at Oregon State

San Jose State

at New Mexico State

No. 18 Fresno State

at Nevada

New Mexico State

at Utah State

No. 24 San Diego State

at UNLV

Colorado State

at Wyoming

References

Hawaii
Hawaii Rainbow Warriors football seasons
Hawaii Rainbow Warriors football